The Treaty of Dunkirk was signed on 4 March 1947, between France and the United Kingdom in Dunkirk (France) as a Treaty of Alliance and Mutual Assistance against a possible German attack in the aftermath of World War II. It entered into force on 8 September 1947 and according with article VI paragraph 2 of its text it remained in force for a period of fifty years.

According to Marc Trachtenberg, the German threat was a pretext for defense against the USSR.

This Treaty preceded the Treaty of Brussels of 1948 (also known as "Brussels Pact"), which established the Western Union among Belgium, France, Luxembourg, the Netherlands and the United Kingdom, that became Western European Union in 1955, after the entry into force of the Treaty of Brussels of 1954 (also known as "Modified Brussels Treaty (MBT)"), when Italy and West Germany were admitted.

See also
 Treaty of Brussels
 Western Union
 North Atlantic Treaty
 Treaty establishing the European Defence Community

References

Further reading
Treaty of Dunkirk text
Treaty of Alliance and Mutual Assistance between the United Kingdom and France
 Signing of the Treaty of Dunkirk

Military alliances involving the United Kingdom
Military alliances involving France
1947 in France
1947 in the United Kingdom
France–United Kingdom treaties
Treaties concluded in 1947
Treaties entered into force in 1947
20th-century military alliances
Treaties of the French Fourth Republic
Treaty
History of Nord (French department)
France–United Kingdom military relations
Military history of the European Union
March 1947 events in Europe
March 1947 events in the United Kingdom